The 1954 IRFU College Draft was the second official sports draft held by the Interprovincial Rugby Football Union, a predecessor of the East Division of the Canadian Football League, in the spring of 1954. 32 players were chosen from among eligible players from five eastern universities, McGill University, Queen's University, University of Toronto, University of Western Ontario, and McMaster University. The Toronto Argonauts had the first selection, Bill McFarlane, in a draft where only six players would ever play in a professional football game.

The following list only includes the first three rounds due to historical limitations.

Round one

Round two

Round three

References

Canadian College Draft
1954 in Canadian football